The 2005 Memorial Cup (branded as the 2005 Mastercard Memorial Cup for sponsorship reasons) was held May 21–29, 2005 at the John Labatt Centre in London, Ontario. It was the 87th annual Memorial Cup competition and determined the major junior ice hockey champion of the Canadian Hockey League (CHL).  The Cup tournament featured the champions from the Western Hockey League (WHL), the Kelowna Rockets; the Quebec Major Junior Hockey League (QMJHL), the Rimouski Océanic; the Ottawa 67's representing the Ontario Hockey League (OHL); and the host team. Since the host team, the London Knights, won the Ontario Hockey League championship against the Ottawa 67's, the 67's earned the right to represent the OHL as the League runner-up.

The Knights had never won the Memorial Cup, unlike the other three teams, despite having a franchise for longer than any of the other three teams (40 seasons). The year 2005 marked both London's first-ever OHL championship and first Memorial Cup victory in its 40-year history.

Round-robin standings

Coverage
Media attention was unusually high, with the television ratings the highest ever recorded for the tournament. There were several reasons for this increase in media attention:
 Lack of competition from the NHL Stanley Cup playoffs. The NHL's 2004–05 season was canceled due to the aforementioned lockout, which made the Memorial Cup the most important North American hockey playoff tournament at the time of the event. Furthermore, some of the young prospects were able to play for their junior teams instead of playing for their affiliated NHL teams. As such, the higher-skilled junior players helped facilitate more competitive games.
 The presence of arguably two of the strongest teams ever in junior hockey:
 The London Knights went 31 games in a row undefeated to begin their season, setting a new CHL record. The team was ranked first in the weekly CHL rankings for the entire length of the season. The Knights had also never won the Memorial Cup in their entire 40-year history, providing the opportunity for the team to win their first Cup in London, as well as during the city's sesquicentennial year.
 The Rimouski Océanic, with superstar Sidney Crosby, went even longer undefeated at the end of the season and into the QMJHL playoffs, setting a new League record with 28 games undefeated. They actually went 35 games without losing including the regular season and QMJHL playoffs, with a third-round loss to Chicoutimi being their only loss in the QMJHL in the 2005 calendar year half of the 2004–05 season. As the CHL did not count the playoff games towards their streak, London's mark remains the longest in the record books, a fact that the Océanic used as motivation. 2005 was also to be Crosby's last year in the CHL and final opportunity to win the Memorial Cup.
 The Kelowna Rockets were the defending Memorial Cup champions.
 The Ottawa 67's, coached by the "legendary" Brian Kilrea, finished in a distant 6th place in their conference but made a strong playoff performance to come back to face the Knights in the OHL final.

Rosters

Schedule

Round robin

Semifinal

Final

Scoring leaders
 Sidney Crosby, RIM (6g, 5a, 11pts)
 Marc-Antoine Pouliot, RIM (3g, 7a, 10pts)
 Dany Roussin, RIM (3g, 6a, 9pts)
 Mario Scalzo, RIM (2g, 7a, 9pts)
 Corey Perry, LDN (4g, 3a, 7pts)
 Patrick Coulombe, RIM (2g, 5a, 7pts)
 Dan Fritsche, LDN (3g, 3a, 6pts)
 Rob Schremp, LDN (1g, 5a, 6pts)
 Danny Syvret, LDN (1g, 4a, 5pts)
 Dylan Hunter, LDN (1g, 4a, 5pts)

Leading goaltenders
 Adam Dennis, LDN (1.58 gaa, .936 sv%)
 Kristofer Westblom, KEL (3.08 gaa, .910 sv%)
 Cedrick Desjardins, RIM (3.69 gaa, .914 sv%)
 Danny Battochio, OTT (3.93 gaa, .907 sv%)

Award winners
 Stafford Smythe Memorial Trophy (MVP): Corey Perry, London
 George Parsons Trophy (sportsmanship): Marc-Antoine Pouliot, Rimouski
 Hap Emms Memorial Trophy (goaltender): Adam Dennis, London
 Ed Chynoweth Trophy (leading scorer): Sidney Crosby, Rimouski

All-Star Team
 Goal: Adam Dennis, London
 Defence: Danny Syvret, London; Mario Scalzo, Rimouski
 Forwards: Corey Perry, London; Dan Fritsche, London; Sidney Crosby, Rimouski

The road to the cup

WHL playoffs

OHL playoffs

QMJHL playoffs

References

External links
 Memorial Cup 
 Canadian Hockey League

Memorial Cup 2005
Memorial Cup tournaments
Memorial Cup 2005